"The Puppet Show" is the ninth episode of season 1 of the television series Buffy the Vampire Slayer. It was written by story editors Rob Des Hotel and Dean Batali, and directed by Ellen S. Pressman.

The Scooby Gang becomes involved in the school talent show through the machinations of the new Sunnydale High principal, Mr. Snyder.

When one of the students involved in the show turns up dead with her heart removed, the gang begins to suspect another talent show performer, Morgan, and his ventriloquist's dummy, Sid, which appears to have a life of its own.

Plot
Snyder, the new school principal, puts Giles in charge of the talent show and makes the Scoobies take part. They watch Morgan and his ventriloquist's dummy, Sid. The act takes a turn for the better when Sid suddenly appears to develop a personality and starts making sarcastic comments.

The scene cuts to Emily, a ballet dancer, alone in the changing rooms. She hears something, turns and screams as a demonic voice whispers, "I will be flesh". Snyder explains to Giles that he will run a safer, more disciplined school—but is interrupted by the discovery of Emily's body, whose heart has been cut out with a knife. The Scoobies debate whether the killer is a demon or a human.

The group splits up to interview people from the talent show to find the killer. Everything seems to point to Morgan. Buffy breaks into his locker, where she finds nothing and is reprimanded by Snyder, who becomes increasingly suspicious of her, as Morgan and Sid secretly watch her. Sid tells Morgan that Buffy is "the one", saying that her strength is evidence of it.

Sid sneaks into Buffy's room as she sleeps, but the noise of his wooden feet wakes her and she sees him. Buffy has a hard time convincing the Scoobies that Sid broke into her room. Giles suggests that the demon responsible might be needing the heart (and later, a brain) to keep a human guise, which means the demon could be anyone.

In the library, just as Willow finds references to another possible explanation—animated dummies might be harvesting organs to become humans—Sid disappears. While searching for Sid, Buffy finds Morgan's body, missing the brain. A chandelier falls on her and Sid attacks, but during their fight she realizes that Sid believes she is the demon and that they are both working for the same goal: to stop the demon.

Sid explains that he is a demon hunter, cursed to dummy form until he kills the last of the Brotherhood of Seven: demons who must harvest a heart and a brain to remain in human form. Realizing the demon has what it needs, they theorize it will be moving on, and so its form will be that of whoever is missing from the talent show.

Sid tells Buffy that once they kill the demon, he will die, since his human body has long since crumbled to dust and bone. Buffy, Willow and Xander discover Morgan had brain cancer, and therefore the demon should now be looking for someone with a healthy, smart brain—someone like Giles.

At the talent show, Marc the magician tricks Giles into strapping himself into a guillotine, supposedly a magic prop. Buffy, Xander and Willow rush to rescue Giles, and with Sid's help they kill Marc—who was the demon all along. Sid finishes the demon by driving a knife through its heart and collapses as his soul is freed from the dummy.

Broadcast and reception
"The Puppet Show" was first broadcast on The WB on May 5, 1997. It received a Nielsen rating of 1.9 on its original airing.

Noel Murray of The A.V. Club gave "The Puppet Show" a grade of C+, calling it "a reasonably entertaining, better-than-average piece of horror-comedy, even as it recycles the hoary old 'killer dummy' routine." He praised the twist and the comedy, but felt that its problem was that it "has nothing to offer beyond a few laughs and a few shocks".

DVD Talk's Phillip Duncan wrote of the episode, "It seems like standard fare until the plot nears the end and the truth is revealed. It's another reversal of roles that keeps the show's format interesting."

A review from the BBC called it "a very inventive episode, and one of the best of the first season". The review praised how the direction was ambiguous in showing whether Sid was really alive, and praised the running joke of Buffy, Willow, and Xander having to participate in the talent show.

References

External links
 

Buffy the Vampire Slayer (season 1) episodes
1997 American television episodes
Ventriloquism